Kohanshahr-e Olya (also Romanized as Kohanshahr-e ‘Olyā) is a village in Najafabad Rural District, in the Central District of Sirjan County, Kerman Province, Iran. At the 2006 census, its population was 435, in 108 families.

References 

Populated places in Sirjan County